Events from the year 2012 in the Denmark.

Incumbents
 Monarch – Margrethe II
 Prime minister – Helle Thorning Schmidt

Events 
 1 January – Denmark takes over the Presidency of the Council of the European Union for a six-month term.
 15 June – Same-sex marriage legalised in Denmark.

Culture

Architecture
 10 January – Bjarke Ingels Group's 8 House receives one of nine AIA Honor Awards from the American Institute of Architects.
 2 March – Henning Larsen Architects' Harpa Concert Hall in Reykjavík and C. F. Møller Architects' Hospice Djursland receive two out of eight 2012 Civic Trust Awards given to projects outside the UK.
 23 March – 3XN's Stadshuis Nieuwegein is inaugurated in the Netherlands.
 29 May – COBE receives the Nykredit Architecture Prize at Nykredit's head office in Copenhagen.
 23 October – Henning Larsen receives the Praemium Imperiale Award for Architecture at a ceremony in Tokyo.

Film

 8 January – Lars von Trier's Melancholia is selected as the Best Film of 2011 by the US Society of Film Critics.
 29 January – At the 2012 Sundance Film Festival, Mads Matthiesen wins the World Cinema Directing Award for his debut film Teddy Bear and the World Cinema Cinematography Award: Documentary goes to Lars Skree for his work on the Danish documentary Putin's Kiss.
 12 February – Nicolas Winding Refn's film Drive is nominated for Best Film at the 65th British Academy Film Awards but the award goes to The Artist.
 18 February – At the 62nd Berlin International Film Festival, the Danish period drama A Royal Affair takes two prizes when Nickolaj Arcel and Rasmus Heisterberg wins a Silver Bear for Best Script and Mikkel Boe Følgsgaard wins a Silver Bear for Best Actor.
 3 March – The 65th Bodil Awards are held in the Bremen Theatre in Copenhagen, Melancholia wins the award for Best Danish Film of the previous year.
 16–27 May – 2012 Cannes Film Festival: Thomas Vinterberg's film The Hunt premiers in competition and the Danish animated student film Slug Invasion is part of the Cinéfoundation program.
 25 May – The Hunt win the Cannes Film Festival.
 27 May – Mads Mikkelsen wins the award for Best Actor at the Cannes Film Festival for his role in The Hunt.
 1 December – Thomas Vinterberg and Tobias Lindholm wins the award for Best Screenwriter at the 25th European Film Awards.

Literature

Media
 10 February – Laerke Posselt wins the award for Best Portrait at the 2012 World Press Photo Contest for her portrait of the Iranian-born Danish actress Mellica Mehraban taken while she apprenticed at Politiken. Jan Dagø from Jyllands-Posten wins 3rd prize in the People in the News (Stories) category for a photo series from the Tahrir Square in Cairo.
 24 April – Borgen and The Killing (season two) are two of the three nominees for Best International YV Series when the nominations for the 2012 British Academy Television Awards are announced.
 27 May – Borgen wins the award for Best International TV Series at the 2012 British Academy Television Awards.

Music

Sport 
 27 July – 12 August – Denmark at the 2012 Summer Olympics in London.

Badminton
 16–21 April – With three gold medals, two silver medals and four bronze medals, Denmark finishes as the best nation at the 2012 European Badminton Championships.

Cycling
 5 May – 2012 Giro d'Italia begins in Herning, Denmark.
 17 May – Lars Bak wins the 12th stage of 2012 Giro d'Italia.

Football

 17 May – FC Copenhagen wins the 2011–12 Danish Cup by defeating AC Horsens 1–0 in the 2012 Danish Cup Final.
 23 May – FC Nordsjælland wins the 2011–12 Danish Superliga by defeating AC Horsens 3–0 in Farum Park after passing FC Copenhagen in the table in the previous round.

Golf
 1 April – Thorbjørn Olesen wins Sicilian Open on the 2012 European Tour.

Handball
 29 January – Denmark wins the 2012 European Men's Handball Championship after defeating Serbia in the final.
 1 March – Mikkel Hansen is named the World's Best Handball Player by the IHF after receiving 31% of the votes.

Motorsports
 14 July – Denmark wins the 2012 Speedway World Cup.

Other
 28 February – Frans Nielsen reaches 300 matches in NHL for New York Islanders in a match against Washington Capitals.

Births
 24 January – Princess Athena of Denmark

Deaths

 1 January – Anders Frandsen, singer and television presenter (b. 1960)
 15 January – Ib Spang Olsen, writer and illustrator (b. 1921)
 19 March – Hanne Borchsenius, film actress (b. 1935)
 22 March – Kirsten Passer, film actress (b. 1930)
 16 April – Mærsk Mc-Kinney Møller, shipping magnate (b. 1913)
 6 May – Jan Trøjborg, politician (b. 1955)
 29 July – John Stampe, footballer (b. 1957)
 11 August – Henning Moritzen, actor (b. 1928)
 2 September – Le Klint, designer (b. 1920)
 21 September – Sven Hazel, author (b. 1917)
 8 October – John Tchicai, saxophonist and composer (b. 1936)
 22 December – Mira Wanting, film actress (b. 1978)

See also 
 2012 in Danish television

References 

 
Years of the 21st century in Denmark
Denmark